Backen is a residential area in Umeå, Sweden. It is home to Backen Church which dates from before 1314.

References

External links
Backen at Umeå Municipality

Umeå